Jamira is a village in Bhojpur district in the Indian state of Bihar.
As per constitution of India and Panchyati Raaj Act, Jamira village is administrated by Sarpanch (Head of Village) who is elected representative of village.

Demography
Jamira is a large village located in Arrah of Bhojpur district, Bihar with total 2058 families residing. The Jamira village has population of 13891 of which 7345 are males while 6546 are females as per Population Census 2011.

In Jamira village population of children with age 0-6 is 2676 which makes up 19.26% of total population of village. Average Sex Ratio of Jamira village is 891 which is lower than Bihar state average of 918. Child Sex Ratio for the Jamira as per census is 858, lower than Bihar average of 935.

Jamira village has lower literacy rate compared to Bihar. In 2011, literacy rate of Jamira village was 55.09% compared to 61.80% of Bihar. In Jamira Male literacy stands at 66.16% while female literacy rate was 42.77%.

Schools and educational institutions
In order of inception
M.S. JAMIRA SCHOOL

People and civil affairs 
Most villagers are employed in agricultural work due to improper education and a lack of skills.

Transportation
Jamira is connected by air (Lok Nayak Jayaprakash Airport), by train  (Ara railway station) and by road.

Complete departure list from Jamira Halt Station

Climate
Climate is characterized by relatively high temperatures and evenly distributed precipitation throughout the year.  The Köppen Climate Classification sub-type for this climate is "Cfa" (Humid Subtropical Climate).

See also

 Bhojpur district, Bihar

References

Villages in Bhojpur district, India